Tamara Téglássy (born 29 September 1968 in Debrecen) is a Hungarian former competitive figure skater. She is an eight-time Hungarian national champion (1984–1991) and competed at the 1988 Winter Olympics in Calgary. She finished in the top ten at four European Championships. Her best world result, 11th, came at the 1988 and 1990 World Championships. She was a member of the Budapest Spartacus Sport Club.

Results

References

Navigation

1968 births
Living people
Hungarian female single skaters
Figure skaters at the 1988 Winter Olympics
Olympic figure skaters of Hungary
Sportspeople from Debrecen